Salry is a townland and locality in Magheracross civil parish, County Fermanagh, Northern Ireland. It is located at 54° 24' 53" N, 7° 36' 47" W. 
Salry is in the Barony of Tirkennedy and is 212.98 acres in area.

References

Villages in County Fermanagh
Townlands of County Fermanagh